The badminton mixed doubles tournament at the 2015 European Games took place from 22 to 28 June.

Competition format
The doubles tournaments will be played with 16 pairs, initially playing in four groups of four, before the top two from each group qualify for an 8-pair knock-out stage.

Schedule
All times are in AZST (UTC+05).

Seeds

Seeds for all badminton events at the inaugural European Games were announced on 29 May.

Results
The group stage draws were held on 2 June.

Group stage

Group A

Group B

Group C

Group D

Knock-out stage

References

External links

Badminton at the 2015 European Games
European